The N-localizer is a device that enables guidance of stereotactic surgery or radiosurgery using tomographic images that are obtained via computed tomography (CT), magnetic resonance imaging (MRI), or positron emission tomography (PET). The N-localizer comprises a diagonal rod that spans two vertical rods to form an N-shape (Figure 1) and permits calculation of the point where a tomographic image plane intersects the diagonal rod. Attaching three N-localizers to a stereotactic instrument allows calculation of three points where a tomographic image plane intersects three diagonal rods (Figure 2). These points determine the spatial orientation of the tomographic image plane relative to the stereotactic frame.

The N-localizer is integrated with the Brown-Roberts-Wells (BRW), Kelly-Goerss, Leksell, Cosman-Roberts-Wells (CRW), Micromar-ETM03B, FiMe-BlueFrame, Macom, and Adeor-Zeppelin stereotactic frames and with the Gamma Knife radiosurgery system.

An alternative to the N-localizer is the Sturm-Pastyr localizer that comprises three rods wherein two diagonal rods form a V-shape and a third, vertical rod is positioned midway between the two diagonal rods (Figure 3). The Sturm-Pastyr localizer is integrated with the Riechert-Mundinger and Zamorano-Dujovny stereotactic frames.

Compared to the N-localizer, the Sturm-Pastyr localizer is less accurate and necessitates more elaborate calculations to determine the spatial orientation of the tomographic image plane relative to the stereotactic frame. In contrast to the N-localizer that does not require specification of the pixel size in a tomographic image, the Sturm-Pastyr localizer requires precise specification of the pixel size.

Research conducted four decades after the introduction of the N-localizer and Sturm-Pastyr localizer has revealed computational techniques that improve the accuracy of both localizers.

Figures

References

Further reading
 

Neurosurgery
Computer-assisted surgery
Surgical oncology